is a retired Japanese racing driver; the son of Satoru Nakajima and the younger brother of Kazuki Nakajima, both of whom have driven in Formula One.

Career
Having started his career in go-karts on the Japanese circuit, Nakajima moved into single-seaters in 2007, competing in the Japanese Formula Challenge series. He finished fifth overall in the championship with four wins, which was won by 2008 Macau Grand Prix winner Keisuke Kunimoto. He graduated into All-Japan Formula Three in 2008, with Toda Racing, finishing ninth overall. Having tested with Räikkönen Robertson Racing over the 2008 offseason, Nakajima joined them for a 2009 campaign in the British Formula 3 Championship. Nakajima finished seventh in the championship standings, with his best result of second coming at Silverstone in August, having started from pole position. He remained with the team for the 2010 season, but failed to improve on his rookie form and returned to Japan for 2011, competing in Formula Nippon with his father's team.

Nakajima retired from racing at the end of the 2019 Super GT Series and has since maintained a low profile.

Racing record

Career summary

Complete Formula Nippon/Super Formula results
(key)

Complete Super GT results

‡ Half points awarded as less than 75% of race distance was completed.

References

External links
 Career statistics from Driver Database
 Nakajima's profile on the official British F3 website

1989 births
Japanese racing drivers
Living people
British Formula Three Championship drivers
Japanese Formula 3 Championship drivers
Formula Nippon drivers
People from Okazaki, Aichi
Super Formula drivers
Formula Challenge Japan drivers
Mugen Motorsports drivers
Double R Racing drivers
Nakajima Racing drivers